Sofrino is an urban locality (an urban-type settlement) in Pushkinsky District of Moscow Oblast, Russia. Population:  It is a production center, where a Russian factory for the production of religious household items, from icons and temple decorations to priests' clothing, and the largest glycerin production enterprise in Europe are located.

References

Urban-type settlements in Moscow Oblast